RER C is one of the five lines in the Réseau Express Régional (English: Regional Express Network), a hybrid commuter rail and rapid transit system serving Paris, France and its suburbs. The  line crosses the region from north to south.

The line runs from the northern termini Pontoise (C1), Versailles-Château-Rive-Gauche (C5) and Saint-Quentin-en-Yvelines (C7) to the southern termini Massy-Palaiseau (C2), Dourdan-la-Forêt (C4), Saint-Martin d'Étampes (C6) and Versailles-Chantiers (C8).

The RER C line is the second-longest in the network, created from an amalgamation and renovation of several old SNCF commuter lines unlike RER A and B which had newer sections owned and constructed by RATP. Each day, over 531 trains run on the RER C alone, and carries over 540,000 passengers daily, 150,000 passengers more than the entirety of the TGV network.

It is the most popular RER line for tourists, who represent 15% of its passengers, as the line serves many monuments and museums, including the Palace of Versailles. However, the numerous stops, combined with the old and fragile infrastructure the line inherited, makes the Parisian section of the RER C very slow and inefficient. In contrast, RER A was constructed with more modern standards enabling much higher average operating speeds. These problems are particularly evident on trips to and from the northern suburbs to the city center as taking Transilien lines and transferring to the Métro is much faster than taking the meandering RER C with closely spaced stops. In addition, the RER C's complicated operating schedule created by its complex network of numerous branches means the entire line is vulnerable to delays from even the smallest incidents.

These issues have led to the line being called "Réseau Escargot Régional" (Regional Snail Network) by the local populace.

History
Line C was opened on 26 September 1979, following the construction of a new  tunnel connecting the Gare d'Orsay railway terminus (now Musée d'Orsay) with the Invalides, terminus of the Rive Gauche line to Versailles, along the banks of the Seine. Services operated between Versailles-Château-Rive-Gauche – Invalides – Quai-d'Orsay, branching to Massy – Palaiseau, and Juvisy – Dourdan / Saint-Martin d'Étampes. At that point the line was named the Transversal Rive Gauche.

In May 1980, service was extended to Saint-Quentin-en-Yvelines – Versailles – Chantiers – Gare des Invalides. The RER C designation was then only introduced from this point onwards, replacing the Transversal Rive Gauche name.

On 25 September 1988, the VMI ("Vallée de Montmorency – Invalides") branch to the north-west opened. This branch mostly used the infrastructure of the "ligne d'Auteuil" (incorporated into the "ligne de petite ceinture" from 1867, closed to passengers from 22 July 1934), and a new  tunnel connection between Batignolles and St-Ouen, connecting to the RER C's main trunk at Champ de Mars-Tour Eiffel via a curved bridge (the only one in Paris) over the Seine river. That extended services to Montigny – Beauchamp and Argenteuil.

Porte de Clichy opened on 29 September 1991. Located between Pereire – Levallois and St-Ouen.

In 1992, the line was extended from Juvisy to Versailles.

A further  extension from Montigny – Beauchamp to Pontoise was opened on 28 August 2000. On the same day a new station, Bibliothèque François Mitterrand, opened in order to create a new connexion with Métro Line 14, located between Paris-Austerlitz and Boulevard Masséna, which was closed and replaced by the new station.

Another new station, St-Ouen-l'Aumône-Liesse, opened on 24 March 2002. Located between Pierrelaye and St-Ouen-l'Aumône.

The C3 branch (from Ermont–Eaubonne to Argenteuil) transferred to the Transilien Paris – Saint-Lazare suburban rail network on 27 August 2006.

On 16 December 2006, Boulevard Victor was renamed Boulevard Victor – Pont du Garigliano to highlight the new interchange with tramway line T3.

In February 2012, Versailles – Rive Gauche was renamed Versailles-Château-Rive-Gauche, to avoid frequent tourist confusion with other stations in Versailles.

Services
Like all other RER lines in Paris, the mission code, or the name of service, consists of four letters. The names of services are displayed on trains and on passenger information display systems. The four-letter code begins with a letter that corresponds to the train's terminus. For example, trains displaying NORA terminate at Pontoise because NORA starts with the letter 'N' (and codes that start with the letter 'N' indicate the destination of Pontoise).

Several services had the code name changed in 2015, for example KUMA to KYVI.

See also
 List of stations of the Paris Métro
 List of stations of the Paris RER

References

External links
 
 RATP official website (in French)
 RATP English website
 Interactive map of the RER (from RATP's website)
 Interactive map of the Paris métro (from RATP's website)
 Mobidf website, dedicated to the RER (unofficial) (in French)
 Metro-Pole website, dedicated to Paris public transports (unofficial) (in French)

C0, RER C
Railway lines opened in 1979